Aguilar de Campoo is a town and municipality of Spain located in the province of Palencia, autonomous community of Castile and León. It is close to the River Pisuerga. Its 2011 population is 7741.

It is one of the locations of the St. James' Northern Way (Ruta del Besaya). Since 2017, the municipality has been included in the Geopark of Las Loras, the first UNESCO Geopark in Castile and León.

History

In May 1255 Alfonso X the Wise granted Aguilar a royal fuero, and thus the town also became a realengo ('royal demesne'). The town maintained that status until 1332. The town featured a seizeable Jewish community in the middle ages.

Gullón and Fontaneda opened biscuit factories in 1904 and 1913, respectively, and the town acquired a reputation as a renowned biscuit-making centre in Spain in the 20th century.

Main sights

Religious architecture
Monastery of Santa María la Real (11th-13th centuries)
Collegiate Church of San Miguel (11th-16th centuries)
Church of Olleros de Pisuerga (7th-9th centuries)
Hermitage of Santa Cecilia (12th century)
Church of San Andrés (12th century)
Monastery of Santa Clara (founded in 1430)

Civil architecture

Medieval castle
 Major Square
 Palace of the Manrique (Marquess of Aguilar de Campoo)
 Palace of the Villalobos-Solorzano
 Palace of the Marquises of Villatorre
 House of the Priest
 House of Santa Mª La Real
 House of the Marcos Gutierrez
 House of the Seven Linajes (lineages)
 House of the Velardes
Medieval walls and gates

Bridges
 Major Bridge
 Bridge of Portazgo
 Bridge of Turruntero Mill
 Bridge of la Teja
 Bridges of Paseo de la Cascajera
 Bridges of Tenerias

Industry 
In Aguilar is Galletas Gullón factory, the largest manufacturer of biscuits in Spain and one of the largest in Europe.

References 
Citations

Bibliography

External links
Official website 
Información, historia, fiestas y fotografias de Aguilar de Campoo 

Municipalities in the Province of Palencia